Orange is an electoral district of the Legislative Assembly in the Australian state of New South Wales. It is a regional electorate that covers four local government areas in their entirety: the City of Orange, Cabonne Council, Parkes Shire and Forbes Shire. 

The seat has been held by Philip Donato since a by-election in November 2016. Donato was initially elected as a member of the Shooters, Fishers and Farmers Party but resigned in 2022 and became an Independent.

History
Orange was created in 1859. Orange and Hartley were absorbed into Bathurst, which elected three members under proportional representation, between 1920 and 1927. In 1927 Bathurst, Hartley and Orange were recreated as single-member electorates.

The area tilts strongly toward the National Party, as Labor hasn't held the seat since 1947, although it came close to winning at the 1996 by-election. The Shooters, Fishers and Farmers Party currently hold the seat, as Andrew Gee resigned to become ultimately the representative of the federal district of Calare.

Members for Orange

First incarnation 1859-1920

Second incarnation 1927-

Election results

References

Electoral districts of New South Wales
1859 establishments in Australia
Orange
1920 disestablishments in Australia
Orange
1927 establishments in Australia
Orange